True Star may refer to:

True Star (perfume), a Tommy Hilfiger product
True Star Ammonite (Asteroceras stellare), an extinct cephalopod
Troschel's true star (Evasterias troscheli), a species of starfish
Tek Sing (Chinese:True Star), a Chinese ocean-going junk that sank in 1822